Kaputol ng Isang Awit (International title: Unsung Melody / ) is a 2008 Philippine television drama romance musical series broadcast by GMA Network. Based on a 1991 Philippine film of the same title, the series is the seventh instalment of Sine Novela. Directed by Mike Tuviera, it stars Glaiza de Castro and Lovi Poe. It premiered on March 3, 2008 on the network's Dramarama sa Hapon line up replacing My Only Love. The series concluded on June 13, 2008 with a total of 73 episodes.

Cast and characters

Lead cast
 Glaiza de Castro as Sarah Monteza-Rivera
 Lovi Poe as Joanna Ambrosio aka Joanna Rivera

Supporting cast
 Marky Cielo as Eric Valderama
 Jolo Revilla as Marco Salcedo
 Snooky Serna as Vina Monteza-Rivera
 Tirso Cruz III as Arsenio Rivera / Kidlat
 Gary Estrada as Julio Ambrosio
 Isabel Granada as Elena Valderama
 Leo Martinez as Ige Monteza
 Tuesday Vargas as Mimay Sison
 Jade Lopez as Daniella

Guest cast
 Jennylyn Mercado as Charmaine Ambrosio
 Rita Iringan as young Sarah
 Bea Binene as young Mimay
 Krystal Reyes as young Joanna
 Tony Mabesa as Tatang Pastor

Ratings
According to AGB Nielsen Philippines' Mega Manila household television ratings, the pilot episode of Kaputol ng Isang Awit earned a 20.2% rating. While the final episode scored a 26.2% rating.

Accolades

References

External links
 

2008 Philippine television series debuts
2008 Philippine television series endings
Filipino-language television shows
GMA Network drama series
Live action television shows based on films
Philippine romance television series
Philippine musical television series
Television shows set in the Philippines